The Hammond organ is an electric organ invented by Laurens Hammond and John M. Hanert. The instrument was first manufactured in 1935. It has two manuals along with a set of bass pedals. A variety of models have been produced. The most popular is the B-3, produced between 1954 and 1974.

The instrument was designed to replace the pipe organ in churches, and early adopters included Henry Ford and George Gershwin, but it was not widely adopted for classical music. However, it was played in African American churches, and its use spread to gospel music and then to jazz in the 1950s. After usage declined in the jazz world in the 1970s, it subsequently regained its popularity in the genre and has become the second most used keyboard instrument in jazz after the piano. Jimmy Smith popularized the Hammond organ, and its technique of using drawbars and pedals.

Having found success in jazz, the Hammond organ became popular in rhythm and blues, including Booker T. & the M.G.'s and other Stax Records artists. From there, it became used in rock music, with users including Ian McLagan, Jean Alain Roussel, Matthew Fisher, Steve Winwood, Mike Finnigan, Gregg Allman and Jon Lord. It became a significant instrument in progressive rock during the early 1970s, and became a featured instrument in ska and reggae. Although the original Hammond Organ Company collapsed, it was purchased by the Suzuki Musical Instrument Corporation, who continued to manufacture the instrument using several former staff for research and development. Jazz organists, including Joey DeFrancesco and Barbara Dennerlein, have continued to feature the Hammond organ into the 21st century.

A

B

C

D

E

F

G

H

I

J

K

L

M

N

O

P

R

S

T

V

W

Y

References
Citations

Bibliography

External links
Jazz Organ History at www.afana.org: includes a "Genealogy of the Jazz Organ"

Hammond organ
List of Hammond organ players
List of Hammond organ players